Pseudo-runes are letters that look like Germanic runes but are not true ancient runes. 
The term is mostly used of incised characters that are intended to imitate runes. Pseudo-runes in this sense are difficult to distinguish from cipher runes, which are characters used as a replacement of standard runes but which do have an intended reading, while pseudo-runes have no linguistic content.

The term "pseudo-runes" has also been used for runes "invented" after the end of the period of runic epigraphy, used only in medieval manuscripts but not in inscriptions. It has also been used for unrelated historical scripts with an appearance similar to runes, and of modern Latin alphabet variants intended to be reminiscent of runic script.

Imitation runes

The main use of the term pseudo-rune is in reference to epigraphic inscriptions using letters that imitate the appearance of runes, but which cannot be read as runes.  These are different from cryptic or magical runic inscriptions comprising a seemingly random jumble of runic letters, which cannot be interpreted by modern scholars, but can at least be read.  In contrast, pseudo-runic inscriptions consist mostly of false letters (some pseudo-runes within a pseudo-runic inscription may coincidentally appear similar or identical to true runes), and so cannot be read at all, even nonsensically.

It has been suggested that pseudo-runic inscriptions were not made by specialist 'rune masters' as is thought to have been the case when carving traditional runic inscriptions, but were made by artisans who were largely ignorant of runes.  According to Nowell Myres, pseudo-runes may have been "intended to impress the illiterate as having some arcane significance".

Manuscript-only runes

The term pseudo-rune has also been used by R. I. Page to refer to runic letters that only occur in manuscripts and are not attested in any extant runic inscription. Such runes include cweorð ᛢ, stan ᛥ, and ior ᛡ. The main variant shape of the rune gér is identical to ᛡ (with ᛄ being a secondary variant of ger), and should not be confused for ior when found epigraphically. The age of these "manuscript-only" runes overlaps with the period of runic inscriptions, e.g. cweorth and stan are both found in the 9th-century  Codex Vindobonensis 795.

Unhistorical runes
 
Of a different type are the pseudo-runes invented in the modern period, such as the unhistorical runes in the Armanen Futharkh (or Armanen runes) created by Guido von List in 1902 and later authors of Germanic mysticism (e.g. Gibor, Hagal, Wendehorn).

Other rune-like scripts
The historical  Old Turkic and Old Hungarian scripts, unrelated with the runes but similar in application (inscriptions etched in stone),   have sometimes been referred to as pseudo-runes or pseudo-runic, or alternatively as "runiform".

See also
 Bind runes
 Calendar runes
 House marks
 List of runestones

Footnotes

References
 
 
 
 
 

Runology
Runiform scripts
Modern runic writing